Huxley Pig is a British stop-motion animated children's television series based on a series of picture books authored by Rodney Peppé.

The series was produced by FilmFair for Central TV, with narration by Martin Jarvis. 26 episodes aired from 1989 through 1990.

General theme

The main character, Huxley Pig, was always dreaming of adventure, exciting professions and encounters. At the start of each episode Huxley would be in his bedroom talking to Sam the squawking seagull and wondering about something. He would open his big suitcase of dress-up clothes, try something on and say, "Hmmm, I wonder". The picture would fade and be taken away into his daydreams for the rest of the story.

In the dream, Sam the Seagull would be able to speak, in a Cockney accent, and there were many other varied characters such as:
 Vile Vincent, the vampire pig-butler
 Horace, a hamster and something of a con artist
 Cuddles, a fanged green beast
 Sidney, a snake with a lisp
 The Ringmaster, the ringmaster pig who runs the Circus
 Ethel, Gloria and Myrtle, The 3 Girls
 Lady Agatha Porker, The Lady who lives at the Hall
 The Zoo Keeper, the zoo keeper pig who only appeared in Huxley Pig at the restaurant

The adventures took Huxley and the gang to many places, as long as there was food nearby. Food was close to Huxley's heart. Upon the conclusion of the daydream, Huxley would return to reality and find a memento from the story had mysteriously returned with him.

Episodes

Series overview

Series 1 (1989)

Series 2 (1990)

Home releases
So far, two DVDs of the series have been released in Region 2.

Huxley Pig At The Circus

Contains the following episodes:
 The Circus
 Haunted House
 Desert Island
 The Beach
 The Clown

Something's Cooking

Contains the following episodes:
 Something Cooking, Huxley Pig
 Huxley Pig and the Sea Monster
 Huxley Pig Goes Flying
 Huxley Pig Goes Camping
 Huxley Pig and the Abominable Snowpig

UK VHS releases
Since their broadcast on ITV in 1989, episodes of the first series were released on three videos by Tempo Video except for "Huxley Pig Goes Camping" that went as part of the Video Treats for Toddlers compilation tape released by Collins Video in 1990 along with Babar, The Adventures of Parsley and The Care Bears.

On 11 February 1991. Tempo Kids Club (distributed by Abbey Home Entertainment) released a single video with two episodes from Series 1 of Huxley Pig which were "Huxley Pig Goes Camping" and "Huxley Pig and the Sea Monster" (Cat. No. 9).NOTE: An extended version of this video was released with an extra episode which is "Huxley Pig the Hairdresser" from Season 2 of Huxley Pig which was broadcast on ITV in 1990.

In about July 1991, Tempo Pre-School (distributed by Abbey Home Entertainment) released a bumper video with four episodes from the second series of Huxley Pig which were previously broadcast on ITV in 1990 along with two previously released episodes from the first Huxley Pig series

In Autumn 1991, a single Huxley Pig video was released and exclusively sold and distributed under license from Abbey Home Entertainment by Entertainment UK Ltd (in its "Starvision" and "Funhouse" range of children's videos) with three single episodes (one debuted episode from Season 2 which is "Huxley Pig Goes Fishing", one previously released episode from Season 2 which is "Huxley Pig In Space" and one previously released episode from Season 1 which is "Huxley Pig at the Restaurant").

Production staff

 Director of Animation  Martin Pullen
 Producer  Jo Pullen
 Executive Producers  Barrie Edwards, David Yates, Lewis Rudd
 Music  Herbert Chappell
 Animators  John Gilluley 
 Camera Assistant  Paul Street
 Model Makers  Alan Murphy
 Costumes  Lizzie Agnew Mark Hall Brian Cosgrove
 Puppet Makers  Justin Exley, Pauline London
 Production Manager  Kath Swain  
 Editors  Andi Sloss, Robert Dunbar 
 Assistant Editor  Jackie Cockie
 Voices  Martin Jarvis

Music

Finnish
Songs in the Finnish dub were sung by the actors of YLE Import re-using the De Angelis's music but with new Finnish lyrics. In the Finnish dub some scenes are cut, which includes musical numbers in some episodes.

Spinoffs

A computer game was released by Alternative Software in 1990 for the Commodore 64 and Amstrad CPC and in 1991 for the ZX Spectrum.

References

External links

1980s British children's television series
1990s British children's television series
1989 British television series debuts
1990 British television series endings
British children's animated adventure television series
English-language television shows
Animated television series about pigs
ITV children's television shows
Nick Jr. original programming
British stop-motion animated television series
Television series by FilmFair
Television series by DHX Media
British television shows based on children's books
Television series by ITV Studios
Television shows produced by Central Independent Television
1980s British animated television series
1990s British animated television series